Hartshorne may refer to:

 Hartshorne (surname)

Places
 Hartshorne, Derbyshire, a village in England
 Hartshorne, Oklahoma, a US city
 Hartshorne Island, an island between Dakers Island and Howard Island in eastern Joubin Islands
 Hartshorne Woods Park, a park in New Jersey

Mathematics
 Hartshorne ellipse

See also
 
 Hartshorn (disambiguation)